Acacia sericoflora is a shrub or tree belonging to the genus Acacia and the subgenus Juliflorae that is native to northern Australia.

Description
The stout and angular branchlets are grey in colour and densely covered in silky hairs. Like most species of Acacia it has phyllodes rather than true leaves. The phyllodes have two prominent main veins free to the base. It blooms between June and July producing yellow flowers.

Distribution
The species has a limited range within western Arnhem Land and within the boundaries of Kakadu and Katherine Gorge National Parks between Gunbalanya and Edith Falls in the Northern Territory where it is found on escarpments and along creek lines growing in clay or sandy soils as a part of woodland or scrubland communities composed of species of Eucalyptus, Melaleuca and Triodia''.

See also
List of Acacia species

References

sericoflora
Flora of the Northern Territory
Taxa named by Leslie Pedley
Plants described in 1974